The church of San Giustino is a church in Rome, in the neighborhood of Alexandria, in Alexandria Avenue.

History
The building of the parish church was erected, designed by architect Francesco Fornari, June 10, 1952 with the decree of the Cardinal Vicar Clemente Micara "To care vigilant" and was inaugurated by the 29 May 1953. He was first assigned to diocesan clergy of Rome (1952-1965) to the clergy of the diocese of Bergamo.
The church was visited by Pope John Paul II November 14, 1982.

The church is the seat to the titular church of "San Giustino", instituted by John Paul II in 2003 and appointed Jean-Baptiste Pham Minh Man as first titular.

List of Cardinal Protectors
 Phạm Minh Mẫn, Archbishop of Ho Chi Minh City (21 October 2001 – present)

References

External links
 San Giustino 

Titular churches
Rome Q. XXIII Alessandrino
Roman Catholic churches completed in 1953
20th-century Roman Catholic church buildings in Italy